Michael John O'Hara FRS FRSE FLSW (22 February 1933 — 24 November 2014) was a British geologist who specialised in igneous petrology.

Life 
Born in Sydney, Australia, but raised in the UK, Michael began his geology studies at Cambridge University, earning his undergraduate and PhD degrees.

In 1958, he took up a position at Edinburgh University in the Grant Institute of Geology. He was appointed to a personal chair in 1970. During this time, he spent some time at the Geophysical Laboratory of the Carnegie Institute, and also served as a NASA principal investigator from 1967 to 1974, working on lunar rock samples from the Apollo missions.  

In 1978, he moved from Edinburgh to become head of the geology department at University College of Wales Aberystwyth, where he remained until 1993. This period included academic postings at California Institute of Technology, Harvard University and Sultan Qaboos University, as well as national administerial duties with the Natural Environment Research Council (NERC). He was finally appointed Distinguished Research Professor at Cardiff University in 1993.

Awards and recognition
Mike O'Hara's made fundamental contributions to the understanding of the origin and evolution of basalts, and their chemical signatures. His “outstanding achievements in research of the constitution and evolution of the Earth and other planets” were recognised with a number of medals and awards, including the Murchison Medal of the Geological Society of London in 1983; the N. L. Bowen Medal of the American Geophysical Union in 1984; and the Harry H. Hess Medal of the American Geophysical Union in 2007.

He was elected Fellow of the Royal Society of Edinburgh in 1969 and Fellow of the Royal Society in 1981. He was a Founding Fellow of the Learned Society of Wales, when it was established in 2010.

References

1933 births
2014 deaths
Petrologists
British geologists
Australian geologists